The Malta national rugby league team (nicknamed the Knights) represent Malta in international rugby league football competitions. They have been competing since 2004.

All-time results record
Below is table of the official representative rugby league matches played by Malta at test level up until 22 June 2022:

Notable players
Despite its size, Malta has a relatively strong national team due to the number of Maltese players that are playing overseas. Malta is able to call on the likes of Jake Mamo, Jarrod Sammut, Jon Magrin, Tyler Cassel, Sean O'Sullivan, and Sam Stone who are all playing in either the NRL or Super League or have represented Malta in the past.

Current squad
23-man squad selected for the international against 🇵🇭 Philippines on 23 October 2022.

Ryan Azzopardi
Matt Borg
Joel Bradford
Anthony Bucca
Carlo Cassar
Kyle Cassel
Tyler Cassel
Jono Dallas
Zarrin Galea
Aaron Grech
Kyal Greene
 Tyson Jackson
Connor McDermott
Blake Phillips
Justin Rodrigues
Zac Rodrigues
Jarrod Sammut
Jake Scott
Ben Stone
Josh Vella
Zac Vella
Jarrod Xerri
Jordan Xuereb

Malta Knights coaches
 Joey Grima 2005-06 (5 matches, 3 wins, 2 losses)
 Tony Farr 2007 (1 match)
 Anthony Micallef 2008-2015 (12 matches, 7 wins, 5 losses)
 Peter Cassar 2017 (1 match, 0 wins, 1 draw, 0 losses)
 Aaron McDonald 2017- (12 matches, 9 wins, 3 losses)
 Sam Blyton-Keep 2017-2018 (3 matches, 0 wins, 3 losses)
 James Camilleri 2018 (1 match, 0 wins, 1 loss)
 Roderick Attard 2021- (3 matches, 1 win, 2 losses)

Results
8 October 2022 Bulgaria 6-50 Malta, Lokomotiv Sofia, Bulgaria

22 June 2022, Lebanon 30-14 Malta, Belmore Oval, Belmore, Australia

14 May 2022, Malta 66-6 Montenegro, Charles Abela Memorial Stadium, Mosta, Malta

6 February 2022 Malta 54-6 North Macedonia, Leichhardt Oval, Sydney, Australia

17 October 2021, Türkiye 36-12 Malta, Huseyin Akar Tesisleri Stadium, Bodrum, Türkiye

14 October 2021, Malta 16-40 Czechia, Huseyin AkarTesisleri Stadium, Bodrum, Türkiye

23 November 2019, Wales 34-16 Malta, Brewery Field, Bridgend, Wales

26 October 2019, Malta 28-12 Türkiye, New Era Stadium, Sydney, Australia

12 October 2019, Malta 23-20 Italy, Kirkham Oval, Sydney, Australia

13 October 2018, Niue 16-24 Malta, St. Mary's Stadium, St. Mary's, Australia

10 October 2018, Hungary 10-20 Malta, St. Mary's Stadium, St. Mary's, Australia

4 October 2018, Malta 16-26 Niue, St. Mary's Stadium, St. Mary's, Australia

1 October 2018, Malta 36-10 Philippines, St. Mary's Stadium, St. Mary's, Australia

15 September 2018, Greece 60-4 Malta, Glyka Stadium, Athens, Greece

30 June 2018, Malta 22-34 Ukraine, Matthew Micallef St. John Athletics Stadium, Marsa, Malta

23 June 2018, South Africa 30-24 Malta, St. Mary's Stadium, St. Mary's, Australia

18 February 2018, Malta 40-0 Hungary, St. Mary's Stadium, St. Mary's, Australia

14 October 2017, Malta 48-16 Hungary, New Era Stadium, Sydney, Australia

8 October 2017, Italy 24-24 Malta, Marconi Stadium, Sydney, Australia

6 May 2017, Lebanon 24-8 Malta, New Era Stadium, Sydney, Australia

4 February 2017, Philippines 26-44 Malta, New Era Stadium, Sydney, Australia

13 October 2016, Ireland 58-10 Malta, Carlisle Grounds, Bray, Ireland

10 October 2015, Malta 30-0 Greece, Matthew Micallef St. John Athletics Stadium, Marsa, Malta

27 September 2015, Spain 40-30 Malta, Polideportivo Cuatre Carreres Stadium, Valencia, Spain

5 September 2015, Malta 22-34 Ireland, Melita FC Stadium, Pembroke, Malta

21 June 2015, Malta 35-34 Belgium, Headingley Carnegie Stadium, Leeds, England

12 July 2014, Czechia 8-34 Malta, Tis RL, Havlichkuv Brod, Czech Republic

28 June 2014, Malta 18-32 Greece, Melita FC, Pembroke, Malta

29 September 2012, Denmark 12-74 Malta, Gentofte Stadium, Copenhagen, Denmark

8 June 2012, Malta 24-12 Denmark, Victor Tedesco Stadium, Ħamrun, Malta

2 September 2011, Malta 64-24 Norway, Melita FC, Pembroke, Malta

23 July 2011, Germany 36-12 Malta, Hochspeyer, Kaiserslautern, Germany

17 October 2010, Malta 0-62 Lancashire, Victor Tedesco Stadium, Ħamrun, Malta

4 June 2010, Malta 30-20 Norway, Victor Tedesco Stadium, Ħamrun, Malta

25 January 2007, Japan 0-82 Malta, Coff's Harbour, Australia

Honours
Major:

Emerging Nations:
Winners (1): 2018

Minor:

European C Championship:
Winners (1): 2010

Medieval Shield:
Winners (1): 2022

See also

 Rugby league in Malta

References

External links
 Malta Rugby league website

National rugby league teams
Rugby league
National rugby league team